Henry deCourcy Richards, also spelled Henry deCoursey Richards, was an American architect who worked in Philadelphia for the public school system.  He designed many public school buildings that have since been listed on the National Register of Historic Places for the quality of their architecture.

Works (credits) include:
Gen. David B. Birney School, 900 W. Lindley St., Philadelphia, PA (Richards, Henry deCourcy) NRHP-listed
Thomas Durham School, 1600 Lombard St., Philadelphia, PA (Richards, Henry deCourcy) NRHP-listed
Feltonville School No. 2, 4901 Rising Sun Ave., Philadelphia, PA (Richards, Henry deCourcy) NRHP-listed
Benjamin Franklin School, 5737 Rising Sun Ave., Philadelphia, PA (Richards,Henry deCourcy) NRHP-listed
Charles Wolcott Henry School, 601-645 W. Carpenter Ln., Philadelphia, PA (Richards, Henry deCourcy) NRHP-listed
Holmes Junior High School, 5429-5455 Chestnut St., Philadelphia, PA (Richards, Henry deCourcy) NRHP-listed
Julia Ward Howe School, 1301-1331 Grange St., Philadelphia, PA (Richards, Henry deCourcy) NRHP-listed
Kensington High School for Girls, 2075 E. Cumberland St., Philadelphia, PA (Richards, Henry deCourcy) NRHP-listed
Henry C. Lea School of Practice, 242 S. 47th St., Philadelphia, PA (Richards, Henry deCourcy) NRHP-listed
Henry Longfellow School, 5004-5098 Tacony St., Philadelphia, PA (Richards, Henry deCourcy) NRHP-listed
James Russell Lowell School, 5801-5851 N. 5th St., Philadelphia, PA (Richards, Henry deCourcy) NRHP-listed
John Marshall School, 1501-1527 Sellers St., Philadelphia, PA (Richards, Henry deCourcy) NRHP-listed
Alexander K. McClure School, 4139 N. 6th St., Philadelphia, PA (Richards, Henry deCourcy) NRHP-listed
Jeremiah Nichols School, 1235 S. 16th St., Philadelphia, PA (Richards, H. deCourcy) NRHP-listed
George Sharswood School, 200 Wolf St., Philadelphia, PA (Richards, Henry deCourcy) NRHP-listed
Bayard Taylor School, 3614-3630 N. Randolph St., Philadelphia, PA (Richards, Henry deCourcy) NRHP-listed
John Greenleaf Whittier School, 2600 Clearfield St., Philadelphia, PA (Richards, Henry deCourcy) NRHP-listed
George L. Brooks School, 5629-5643 Haverford Ave., Philadelphia, PA (Richards, Henry deCoursey) NRHP-listed
Horace Furness Junior High School, 1900 S. Third St., Philadelphia, PA (Richards, Henry deCoursey) NRHP-listed
William B. Hanna School, 5720-5738 Media St., Philadelphia, PA (Richards, Henry deCoursey) NRHP-listed
Nathaniel Hawthorne School, 712 S. Twelfth St., Philadelphia, PA (Richards, Henry deCoursey) NRHP-listed
John L. Kinsey School, Sixty-fifth Ave. and Limekiln Pike, Philadelphia, PA (Richards, Henry deCoursey) NRHP-listed
S. Weir Mitchell School, Fifty-sixth and Kingsessing St., Philadelphia, PA (Richards, Henry deCoursey) NRHP-listed
William Penn High School for Girls, 1501 Wallace St., Philadelphia, PA (Richards, Henry deCoursey) NRHP-listed
Edgar Allan Poe School, 2136 Ritner St., Philadelphia, PA (Richards, Henry deCoursey) NRHP-listed
Thomas Buchanan Read School, Seventy-eighth and Buist Ave., Philadelphia, PA (Richards, Henry deCoursey) NRHP-listed
Southwark School, Eighth and Miflin Sts., Philadelphia, PA (Richards, Henry deCoursey) NRHP-listed
Anthony Wayne School, 2700 Morris St., Philadelphia, PA (Richards, Henry deCoursey) NRHP-listed
West Philadelphia High School, 4700 Walnut St., Philadelphia  PA (Richards, Henry deCoursey) NRHP-listed
Francis E. Willard School, Emerald and Orleans Sts., Philadelphia, PA (Richards, Henry deCoursey) NRHP-listed

His successor as school designer for Philadelphia was Irwin T. Catharine.

References

20th-century American architects
Architects from Philadelphia
Year of birth missing
Year of death missing